Ammonium malate refers to organic compounds containing malate and ammonium.  Two stoichiometries are discussed: NH4(C2H3(OH(CO2)2H, containing one ammonium ion per formula unit, and (NH4)2(C2H3(OH(CO2)2.  Malate, the conjugate base of malic acid, is chiral.  Consequently a variety of salts are possible, R vs S vs racemic.  The monoammonium salt has been crystallized as the monohydrate.

Diammonium malate has been used as a food additive and has the E number E349 and is the subject of some controversy.

References 

Malates
Ammonium compounds
Food additives